is a Japanese manga series written and illustrated by Kagiji Kumanomata. It has been serialized in Shogakukan's Weekly Shōnen Sunday magazine since May 2016, with its chapters collected in twenty-three tankōbon volumes as of October 2022. An anime television series adaptation produced by Doga Kobo aired from October to December 2020.

Plot
The story follows Princess Syalis, a young princess who was kidnapped by the Demon King, and her quest to sleep well while imprisoned. Despite the Demon King's best attempts, the princess turns her kidnapping into a vacation; having grown tired with the stress of a royal life, she is indifferent to the situation.

Characters

 Princess Syalis  is a princess who was kidnapped by the demon king and causes chaos in the demon castle while trying to get a good night's sleep. She has been living at the demon king's castle for four years now.
 

 He kidnapped Syalis in her sleep, so he has hardly ever seen her awake and has never had a proper conversation with her. He is always thinking of ways to make the hero get to him and gets worried if he is going to lose, he even puts weapons and tools to make the hero's quest easier. Apart from that he is a good leader for the demons of the castle, but even he can't go against Princess Syalis, and is shown to care for her to a certain point.

 Demon Cleric might seem like a gentle young man, but he is actually the demon in charge of the Demon Temple inside the Demon Castle. The Demon Cleric is usually the one called upon to use magic to resurrect anyone who happens to die in the Demon Castle.

Dawner is the hero who is entrusted by the Human Confederation of Goodereste with the task of saving Princess Syalis from the demon castle. Although Dawner and Princess Sylias are childhood friends and also engaged, she does not remember who he is. Whenever she mentions Dawner to the denizens of the demon castle, she calls him, "D-Whatsit". Due to Dawner being outgoing and friendly to Princess Syalis, he had always disturbed her slumber, thus causing her to have nightmares whenever she dreams about him. He is also known for his poor sense of direction, which explains why Princess Syalis has been captured for four years.

 He and his subordinates are the principal victims of Princess Syralis's antics, especially when she needs cloth to make things to get a good sleep. The death of the Ghost Shrouds by the Princess is a common joke in the series.

Queen of Goodereste, a kingdom of humankind, and mother of Princess Suyaris.

Media

Manga
Sleepy Princess in the Demon Castle is written and illustrated by Kagiji Kumanomata. The series started in Shogakukan's Weekly Shōnen Sunday on May 11, 2016. Shogakukan has collected its chapters into individual tankōbon volumes. The first volume was released on September 16, 2016. As of October 18, 2022, twenty-three volumes have been released.

Viz Media announced in September 2017 that they had licensed the series in North America. The first volume was released on June 12, 2018.

An official fanbook of the series was released on October 16, 2020.

Volume list

Anime
An anime television series adaptation was announced in Weekly Shōnen Sunday in September 2019. The series was animated by Doga Kobo and directed by Mitsue Yamazaki, with Yoshiko Nakamura handling series composition and Ai Kikuchi designing the characters. Yukari Hashimoto composed the series' music. The series ran for 12 episodes from October 6 to December 22, 2020 on TV Tokyo, AT-X, and BS TV Tokyo. Inori Minase performed the opening theme , while ORESAMA performed the ending theme "Gimmme!".

Funimation acquired the series and streamed it on its website in North America and the British Isles. On February 21, 2021, Funimation announced the series would receive an English dub, with the first episode premiering the next day. Following Sony's acquisition of Crunchyroll, the series was moved to Crunchyroll. In Southeast Asia and South Asia, the anime is licensed by Muse Communication, and released on Bilibili in Southeast Asia. The series premiered on Animax Asia on May 12, 2021.

Episode list

Notes

References

External links
 
 

2016 manga
Adventure anime and manga
Anime series based on manga
Comedy anime and manga
Crunchyroll anime
Demons in anime and manga
Doga Kobo
Fantasy anime and manga
Muse Communication
Shogakukan manga
Shōnen manga
Slice of life anime and manga
TV Tokyo original programming
Viz Media manga
Works set in castles